Ukraine has 50 Ramsar sites designated as Wetlands of International Importance. The Ramsar Convention on Wetlands came into effect for Ukraine on 1 December 1991.

Ukraine Wetlands of International Importance

References

External links
 The Annotated Ramsar List of Wetlands of International Importance: Ukraine
 Wetlands of Ukraine with a list of all wetlands including recognized by the Ramsar Convention and potentially to be recognized in the future



 
Ukraine